Station numbering is a sign system which assigns station codes consisting of a few letters and numbers to train stations. It aims to facilitate navigation for foreign travelers not familiar with the local language by using globally understood characters (Latin letters and Arabic numbers). The system is now in use by various railway companies around the world such as in Mainland China, Indonesia, Japan, South Korea, Singapore, Taiwan, Thailand, and the United States.

History 
Station numbering first introduced—but to less fanfare—in South Korea, by the Seoul Metropolitan Subway in 1983 as a section of Seoul Subway Line 2 (Euljiro 1-ga to Seongsu) was opened.

Its first usage in Japan was in the Nagasaki Electric Tramway where it was introduced in May 1984. The Tokyo subway system introduced station numbering in 2004. Sports events are usually the turning point for the introduction of station numbering in Japan; the Yokohama Municipal Subway introduced station numbering in preparation for the 2002 FIFA World Cup and there was a mass adoption of station numbering in the months leading to the 2020 Summer Olympics.

Structure 
The station number often consists of two parts: the "Line symbol part", and the "Station symbol part".

Line symbol part 
The line symbol part is the part that represents the railway line the station is belonged to. Therefore, all stations on the same railway line shares the same line symbol part.

In some countries, such as South Korea and Mainland China, where the railway lines are often named with numbers (e.g. Line 1, Line 15), the number used to name the railway line is used as the line symbol.

In other countries, such as Japan, where the railway lines are often not named with numbers, the line symbol part usually consist of one or two letters, which are often abbreviations of the Romaji notation of the line name, many of them being the initials. However, when there are more than two lines with the same initials in the same region, either of them is often changed in order to avoid duplicated line symbols, even across different company lines (for example, the Tokyo Metro Marunouchi Line uses ‘M’  and the Toei Mita Line uses ‘I’ , although the name of the two lines both starts with the letter M). Another method to avoid duplicated line symbols is to assign them in an alphabetical order (A to Z) regardless to the abbreviations.

While most of the station numbering systems follow the aforementioned two styles, there is a few exceptions. Shinbundang Line of Korea uses the line symbol of letter D, even though there is no notable reason preventing them from following the two popular styles presented above. Neo Trans, the line's operating company, mentions it is a part of their branding strategy: to emphasise the latest digital technologies applied to their railway line. Another group of examples of such exceptions is found among minor branch lines operated by Seibu Railway of Japan. One of their railway lines is Seibu Ikebukuro Line, which has the line symbol of SI (the alphabet abbreviation of the line name). Sayama Line, a branch line that splits off from Seibu Ikebukuro Line, shares the same line symbol of SI, even though its own alphabet abbreviation is not SI.

Station symbol part 

The station symbol part is the part that identifies each station on the scale of one entire railway line. Therefore, there must not be any duplicated station symbols on the same railway line: no more than one station on the same railway line should have the identical station symbol.

In most of the cases, the station symbol is a two digit number. Usually, the starting station of a railway line is assigned number 00 or 01, and stations along the line are distributed sequentially ascending whole numbers (i.e. If the starting station is assigned the number 01, the first station a person traveling outwards from the starting station would encounter will be assigned the number 02, then the station after this will be assigned 03, and so on). It is notable that, unlike other regions of the world, most of the station numbering systems in Korea assigns number 10, instead of number 00 or 01, to the starting station of a railway line. This is known to be a part of preparation for the possibility of line extension, so that the stations on the extended section could be easily numbered, rather than shifting and renumbering the entire line (e.g. the extension of Seoul Subway Line 4 from Sanggye station (410) to Danggogae station (409)).

As for any branch sections branching off from the main line (like a ‘Y’ shape track), there are several possible methods to number the stations located on the branch sections.

 Branch numbers (i.e. Seoul Subway Line 2 Seongsu Branch Line branches off from Main line of Line 2 at Seongsu station, which has the station number of 211. Thus, the stations located on the branch line are assigned station numbers of 211-1, 211-2, 211-3, and 211-4.)
 Prefix of letter 'P', the abbreviation of the word 'Point' (i.e. Seoul Subway Line 5 Macheon Branch Line branches off from Main line of Line 5 at Gangdong station, which has the station number of 548. Thus, the stations located on the branch line are assigned station numbers of P549, P550, P551, and (so on up to) P555.)
 Skipped numbers (i.e. Hankyu Koyo Line branches off from Hankyu Kobe Main Line at Shukugawa station, which has the station number of HK-09. Thus, the stations located on Koyo Line are assigned station numbers of HK-29 and HK-30.)
 In some cases where there is a station located on the branch line branching off from the branch line of a main line, combined method of branch numbers and prefix of letter 'P' could be used (i.e. Seodongtan station of Seoul Subway Line 1, which has the station number of P157-1).

Likewise, there are several possible methods to number the new stations constructed after the initial opening of the railway line. Written inside each bracket below are the station numbers which would be assigned to the new stations under each method, assuming an imaginary case where, for example, two new stations are added between stations of number 07 and 08.

 Shifting and renumbering the entire line
 Using branch numbers with a hyphen (07-1, 07–2)
 Using branch numbers without adding hyphen (071, 072)
 Using decimal numbers (07.5, 07.6)

Companies using Station Numbering 
Sub-Heading 1 are sorted in alphabetical order.

China, People's Republic of 
 Beijing Subway (Line 1, 2, 13 and Batong Line)
 Chengdu Metro & Chengdu Tram
 Chongqing Rail Transit
 Dongguan Rail Transit
 Foshan Metro, Gaoming Tram and Nanhai Tram
 Guangzhou Metro,  Haizhu Tram and Huangpu Tram
Macau Light Rapid Transit
 Shanghai Metro (Line 10 only)
 Wuxi Metro
 Zhengzhou Metro

Indonesia 
 Greater Jakarta region
 Transjakarta BRT
 KRL Commuterline
 Soekarno–Hatta Airport Rail Link
 Jakarta MRT
 Jakarta LRT
 Greater Jakarta LRT
 Yogyakarta and Surakarta region
 Adisumarmo Airport Rail Link
 KAI Commuter Yogyakarta Line
 Yogyakarta International Airport Rail Link
 Batara Kresna Railbus

Japan 

 Hokkaidō region
 Hokkaido Railway Company, adopted on 1 October 2007
 Sapporo Municipal Subway, adopted on 26 January 2006
 Sapporo Streetcar, adopted on 1 April 2015
 Hakodate Transportation Bureau
 South Hokkaido Railway Company, adopted on 26 March 2016
 Tōhoku region
 Kōnan Railway Company, adopted on 10 October 2020 for Ōwani Line, and 12 April 2021 for Kōnan Line
 Sendai Subway, adopted in March 2015
 Kantō region
 East Japan Railway Company, adopted on 20 August 2016 for metropolitan area, January 2018 for all Narita Line stations, November 2018 for all Tōkaidō Line and Itō Line stations, March 2019 for all Chūō Line Rapid stations, and March 2020 for Chūō Line stations east of Kobuchizawa.
 Tokyo Monorail
 Tokyo Waterfront Area Rapid Transit (Rinkai Line)
 Tokyo Metro, adopted on 1 April 2004
 Tokyo Metropolitan Bureau of Transportation
 Toei Subway, adopted on 1 April 2004
 Toden Arakawa Line and Nippori-Toneri Liner, adopted in November 2017
 Tokyo Waterfront New Transit (Yurikamome), adopted on 27 March 2006
 Keisei Electric Railway, adopted on 17 July 2010
 Shin-Keisei Electric Railway, adopted in February 2014
 Hokusō Railway, adopted on 17 July 2010
 Shibayama Railway, adopted on 17 July 2010
 Keikyu, adopted on 21 October 2010
 Tokyu Corporation, adopted in February 2012
 Yokohama Minatomirai Railway (Minatomirai Line), adopted in September 2012
 Tobu Railway, adopted on 17 March 2012
 Seibu Railway, adopted in March 2013
 Keio Corporation, adopted on 22 February 2013
 Odakyu Electric Railway, adopted in January 2014
 Include Hakone Tozan Railway, Hakone Ropeway and Hakone Sightseeing Cruise
 Sagami Railway (Sotetsu), adopted in February 2014
 Metropolitan Intercity Railway Company (Tsukuba Express), adopted on 24 August 2005
 Watarase Keikoku Railway (Watarase Keikoku Line), adopted on 22 March 2017
 Saitama New Urban Transit (New Shuttle), adopted on 23 March 2018
 Saitama Railway Corporation (Saitama Rapid Railway Line), adopted in 2016
 Chichibu Railway, adopted in September 2022
 Ryutetsu (Nagareyama Line), adopted in May 2018
 Chiba Urban Monorail, adopted in February 2019
 Tōyō Rapid Railway (Tōyō Rapid Railway Line), adopted on 15 March 2014
 Chōshi Electric Railway Line, adopted on 23 November 2018
 Tokyo Tama Intercity Monorail (Tama Toshi Monorail), adopted in February 2018
 Yokohama Municipal Subway, adopted in 2002
 Kanazawa Seaside Line, adopted in 2010
 Enoshima Electric Railway, adopted on 9 June 2011
 Shonan Monorail
 Tokyo BRT, adopted on 1 October 2020
 Chūbu region
 Central Japan Railway Company, adopted in March 2018
 East Japan Railway Company, only on their Ōito Line section, adopted on 12 December 2016
 Izukyū Corporation, adopted in December 2016
 Izuhakone Railway
 Gakunan Electric Train (Gakunan Railway Line), adopted in April 2020
 Fuji Kyuko, adopted on 1 July 2011
 Nagano Electric Railway
 Ueda Kōtsū (Ueda Electric Railway Bessho Line), adopted on 1 April 2016
 Alpico Kōtsū, adopted in March 2017
 Toyama Chihō Railway, adopted on 9 February 2019 for tram routes, 16 March for rail lines, and 21 March 2020 for Toyamakō Line (during merging of the Toyama Light Rail company)
 Hokuriku Railroad, adopted on 1 April 2019
 Echizen Railway, adopted on 25 March 2017
 Fukui Railway
 Nagaragawa Railway (Etsumi-Nan Line), adopted in 2017
 Akechi Railway, adopted in 2017
 Shizuoka Railway, adopted on 1 October 2011
 Enshū Railway Line, adopted in December 2007
 Toyohashi Railroad, adopted in 2007 for Azumada Main Line, and 2008 for Atsumi Line
 Nagoya Municipal Subway, adopted on 6 October 2004
 Nagoya Guideway Bus (Yutorito Line)
 Nagoya Rinkai Rapid Transit (Aonami Line)
 Aichi Rapid Transit (Linimo), adopted on 6 March 2005
 Aichi Loop Line, adopted on 1 April 2004
 Meitetsu, adopted in March 2016
Tarumi Railway (Tarumi Line)
 Kansai (Kinki and Chūgoku) region
 West Japan Railway Company, adopted on 6 August 2014
 Ise Railway, adopted on 1 August 2008
 Nankai Electric Railway, adopted on 23 February 2012
 Semboku Rapid Railway
 Hankai Tramway
Willer Trains (Kyoto Tango Railway), adopted in 2015
Osaka Monorail, adopted on 19 March 2007
 Osaka Metro, adopted on 1 July 2004
 Kita-Osaka Kyuko Railway
 Kintetsu Railway, adopted on 27 March 2006 for Nara Line, and 20 August 2015 for the rest
 Kobe Municipal Subway, adopted on 1 September 2004
 Kobe New Transit, adopted on 2 February 2006
 Hankyu, adopted on 21 December 2013
 Nose Electric Railway
 Hanshin Electric Railway, adopted in April 2014
 Sanyo Electric Railway, adopted on 7 February 2014
 Kobe Electric Railway, adopted on 1 April 2014
Keihan Electric Railway, adopted on 1 April 2014
Kyoto Municipal Subway, adopted on 26 November 2004
 Keifuku Electric Railroad, adopted on 19 March 2007
 Eizan Electric Railway, adopted on 19 October 2008
 Ohmi Railway, adopted in 2018
 Wakayama Electric Railway (Kishigawa Line), adopted in 2015
 Okayama Electric Tramway, adopted in May 2017
 Mizushima Rinkai Railway, adopted in 2019
 Hiroshima Electric Railway, adopted in October 1996
 Ichibata Electric Railway
 Shikoku region
 Shikoku Railway Company, Asa Seaside Railway (Asatō Line) and Tosa Kuroshio Railway, adopted on 1 March 2006
Tosa Kuroshio Railway cancelled station numbers in December 2021, as route service replaced by dual-mode vehicles.
 Takamatsu-Kotohira Electric Railroad, adopted on 15 December 2013
 Iyotetsu, adopted in June 2015
 Kyūshū region
 Kyushu Railway Company, adopted on 30 September 2018
 Fukuoka City Subway, adopted on 24 January 2011
 Nishi-Nippon Railroad, adopted on 1 February 2017
 Chikuhō Electric Railroad Line, adopted on 28 January 2013
 Kitakyushu Monorail
 Heisei Chikuhō Railway, adopted on 1 October 2019
 Nagasaki Electric Tramway, adopted on 30 May 1984
 Kumamoto City Transportation Bureau, adopted on 1 March 2011
 Kumamoto Electric Railway, adopted on 1 October 2019
 Hisatsu Orange Railway, adopted on 1 October 2019
Kumagawa Rail Road (Yunomae Line)
 Kagoshima City Transportation Bureau, adopted in April 2018
 Okinawa Urban Monorail, adopted on 1 October 2019

Korea, Republic of 
 Korail
 Seoul Metropolitan Subway
 Seoul Metro, adopted in  1982–1983
 Incheon Subway
 Seoul Metro Line 9 Corporation
 Airport Railroad Corporation (AREX)
 Yongin Rapid Transit Corporation (Everline)
 Uijeongbu LRT Corporation (U Line)
 NeoTrans Co. Ltd. (Shinbundang Line)
 E-Rail (Seohae Line)
 Busan Metro
 Busan–Gimhae Light Rail Transit Operation Corporation
 Daegu Metro
 Daejeon Metro
 Gwangju Metro

Malaysia 
 Klang Valley Integrated Transit System (stations)

Singapore 
 MRT (stations)
 LRT (stations)

Taiwan 
 Taiwan Railways Administration
Taiwan High Speed Rail
Taipei Metro
New Taipei Metro
Taoyuan Metro
 Taichung Metro
 Kaohsiung Rapid Transit

Thailand 
 BTS Skytrain
 MRT Blue Line
 MRT Purple Line
 Airport Rail Link

United States
 MARTA (Atlanta) (stations)
 WMATA (Washington D.C.) (stations)

See also
Station code

References

External links 
 JR East Station Numbering Map(Metropolitan Area)

Railway stations
Rail transport classification systems
Rail transport in Japan